Stefan Brands designed the core cryptographic protocols of Microsoft's U-Prove technology. Earlier versions of these protocols were implemented by DigiCash, Zero-Knowledge Systems, Credentica, and a consortium of European banks and IT organizations. For technical details, see Brands' book "Rethinking Public Key Infrastructures and Digital Certificates," published by the MIT Press.

Brands has been a principal architect at Microsoft, an adjunct professor at McGill University, and an advisor to Canada's data protection commissioner and the Electronic Privacy Information Center.

References

External links

Living people
Microsoft employees
Dutch cryptographers
Dutch mathematicians
Utrecht University alumni
Academic staff of McGill University
Eindhoven University of Technology alumni
Year of birth missing (living people)